The following elections occurred in the year 1876.

Europe
 1876 Dalmatian parliamentary election
 1876 French legislative election
 1876 Leominster by-election
 1876 Spanish general election

North America

Canada
 1876 Prince Edward Island general election

Mexico
 1876 Mexican general election

United States
 1876 New York state election
 1876 South Carolina gubernatorial election
 1876 United States elections
 1876 and 1877 United States House of Representatives elections
 United States House of Representatives elections in California, 1876
 United States House of Representatives elections in South Carolina, 1876
 1876 United States presidential election
 1876 and 1877 United States Senate elections

Oceania
 1875–1876 New Zealand general election

South America
 1876 Chilean presidential election

See also
 :Category:1876 elections

1876
Elections